Morgan Hultman (born 11 December 1912) was a Swedish tennis player who was active in the 1930s.

Tennis career
Hultman was a member of the Swedish Davis Cup team during the 1939 Davis Cup competition. In the Europe Zone second round tie against Denmark, that was played in Stockholm, Hultman lost his first singles matches, against Helge Plougmann and then defeated Niels Holst in his second match. In the quarterfinals against Germany, Hultman lost both his singles matches, against Roderich Menzel and Rolf Göpfert, in straight sets.

See also
List of Sweden Davis Cup team representatives

References

External links
 
 

1912 births
Swedish male tennis players
Year of death missing
20th-century Swedish people